Marcipopsis is a genus of moths of the family Erebidae. The genus was erected by Emilio Berio in 1966. All the species are found on Madagascar.

Species

References

External links

Calpinae